Stephen John Adshead (born 29 January 1980 in Worcester, Worcestershire) is an English first-class cricketer. He is a right-handed batsman and wicketkeeper who, in nearly 10 years as a first-class cricketer, has played for Gloucestershire, Herefordshire, Leicestershire and Worcestershire.

Adshead's first-class best of 156 not out came against Essex in 2009.

He was released by Gloucestershire at the end of the 2009 season , having played 70 of his 73 first-class games for the county.  In all he scored 3077 runs, including 3 hundreds, at 32.05 and took 192 catches and completed 15 stumpings.  He scored 1566 runs in 99 list A one-day matches, taking 103 catches and 30 stumpings.  He also played 49 twenty/20 matches.

Adshead recorded a score of 240* coming from just 169 deliveries on Saturday 5 May 2012 playing for Astwood Bank 1st XI.

References

1980 births
Living people
Sportspeople from Redditch
English cricketers
Gloucestershire cricketers
Leicestershire cricketers
Worcestershire cricketers
Herefordshire cricketers
Leicestershire Cricket Board cricketers
Shropshire cricketers
Derbyshire cricketers
Wicket-keepers